Hotel Belgrade is a 2020 Russian-Serbian romantic comedy film directed by Konstantin Statsky, a sequel to the television series Hotel Eleon and Grand. It stars Miloš Biković and Diana Pozharskaya.

It was theatrically released in Russia on March 5, 2020.

Plot 
The film tells about a cheerful owner of a five-star hotel in Belgrade, who must marry his daughter in order to pay off his debts. And suddenly he meets Dasha, his Russian love.

Cast 
 Miloš Biković as Pavel "Pasha" Arkadijevic (Serbian: Paul), owner of the Belgrade Hotel in Serbia, Vedrana's ex-fiance
  as Daria "Dasha" Kanaeva is a Russian athlete and travel blogger in Serbia, Pyotr Romanov ex-wife
 Boris Dergachev as Ivan, Pasha's friend
 Aleksandra Kuzenkina as Yulia Makarovna Komissarova (Serbian: Julija), Dasha's best friend 
 Egor Koreshkov as Pyotr Romanov flew to Mars, Dasha's ex-husband
 Ljubomir Bandović as Dusan, a crime boss
 Jelisaveta Orašanin as Vedrana, Dusan's daughter
 Miodrag Radonjić as Srecko
 Srđan Todorović as Milos, Pasha's grandfather

Production 
In October 2018, it became known about the creation of a feature film based on the sitcoms Hotel Eleon and Grand - Hotel Belgrade, the shooting of which started on September 5, 2019.

Principal photography took place in Belgrade, as well as other Serbian towns and villages in Serbia, and Moscow, Russia. The film shows Serbian sights and landscapes in detail.

Release 
The film premiered in Russian cinemas on March 5, 2020, by Central Partnership.

References

External links 
 

2020 films
2020s Russian-language films
2020s Serbian-language films
Serbian romantic comedy films
2020 romantic comedy films
Russian romantic comedy films
Films based on television series
2020 multilingual films
Russian multilingual films
Serbian multilingual films